Motorway 27 (A27) is a branch of the A2 motorway (Egnatia Odos) at Kozani, which leads towards Ptolemaida and from there to Florina and the Niki border crossing with North Macedonia. It is part of the European route E65.

Within 2012 tenders were announced for the construction of the 14,5 km section from Florina up to the border crossing with North Macedonia as a motorway. Construction started in 2013 and finished in December 2015. The northern part from Florina to Niki was opened to traffic on 20 May 2016. The section from Ptolemaida to Florina is operational as an expressway (GR-3) and is planned to be upgraded to a motorway sometime until 2025.

Exit list

References

27
Roads in Western Macedonia